George Radcliffe may refer to:

 Sir George Radcliffe (politician) (1593–1657), English politician
 George L. P. Radcliffe (1877–1974), U. S. Senator
 George Radcliffe (footballer), English footballer
 George Radcliffe (cricketer) (1877–1951), English cricketer

See also
George Ratcliffe (disambiguation)